Suffolk Downs was a seasonal flag stop along the Montauk Branch of the Long Island Rail Road and was first built in 1907. The depot was purchased by an LIRR employee and was moved to Peconic Bay at an undisclosed location on February 6, 1923 and the station stop itself closed around 1927. The station stop was located between Canoe Place and Shinnecock Hills Stations.

References

Former Long Island Rail Road stations in Suffolk County, New York
Railway stations in the United States opened in 1907
1907 establishments in New York (state)
Railway stations closed in 1927
Southampton (town), New York